The 710th Infantry Division was a German Army infantry division in World War II. Formed in May 1941, it spent the majority of the war in occupation duties in Scandinavia before being transferred to the Italian Front in late 1944. It participated in fighting against the Soviet Union in Hungary before it withdrew into Austria and surrendered to the Americans in May 1945.

History 

The 710th Infantry Division was formed on 2 May 1941, largely from older personnel, under the command of Generalleutnant Theodor Petsch. It was smaller than a conventional infantry division and lacked much of the support weaponry that would typically be found in such a unit.  The division served occupation duties in Norway, firstly at Oslo and then at Kristiansand. It later performed similar duties in Denmark until December 1944, at which stage it was transferred to the Italian Front. The following month it was attached to I SS Panzer Corps, which had moved to Hungary after the Battle of the Bulge.

The division, expanded with additional artillery and tank destroyer units, was involved in the fighting against Soviet troops during Operation Spring Awakening and the subsequent withdrawal through Hungary and into Austria. Now under the command of Generalmajor Walter Gorn, it surrendered to a United States Army unit on 8 May 1945.

Notes
Footnotes

Citations

References

Military units and formations established in 1941
Military units and formations disestablished in 1945
Infantry divisions of Germany during World War II